Gael Margulies (born April 3, 1994) is an Israeli footballer who played as a forward for Beitar Tel Aviv Ramla.

Margulies studied at Rothberg High School at Ramat HaSharon. Aside being an Israeli, he also holds a Belgian citizenship.

Early life
Margulies was born in Ramat HaSharon, Israel, to a Jewish family.

Club career

Margulies started his career at the age of 9 in Maccabi Tel Aviv youth team. At the age of 16, he was called for a one-week-trial by the Premier League famous club, Arsenal.

On May 21, 2011 at the age of 17, Margulies made his debut in the Israeli Premier League, in a match between Maccabi Tel Aviv and Maccabi Netnaya which was won by Maccabi at the score 4-1, wearing the number 34 shirt at his back. Margulies substituted Maor Bozaglo at the 75th minute and had an instant effect by retaining a penalty kick for his club at the 87th minute, which was later scored by Barak Itzhaki. At that season, 2010/2011 Margulies retained the championship with the youth squad of Maccabi Tel Aviv.

On 2011/2012, Margulies led his team for a 2nd consecutive championship in the youth league, scoring 16 goals and being elected as Players-Player-Of-The-Year by the league players, despite an absence of a month from the football pitch, due to long contracts negotiations with Maccabi. His goals earned him the Best-Scorer of the season title in the league. On July 3, 2012 after lot of negotiations, Margulies committed his future to Maccabi Tel Aviv by signing a 5-years contract.

On December 30, 2012 at the age of 18, Margulies scored his 1st ever goal for the senior club of Maccabi Tel Aviv, at the 75th minute of the match against Hapoel Haifa in Bloomfield Stadium after being substituted into the game.

Margulies made his UEFA Champions League debut during the 3rd qualifying round against F.C. Basel on 6 August 2013 after replacing Eran Zahavi at the 63rd minute.

On 13 July 2015 on loaned to Maccabi Netanya.

Career statistics

Club

As of 23 October 2013.

Honours
Maccabi Tel Aviv
 Israeli Premier League: 2012–13, 2013–14, 2014–15
 Israel State Cup: 2014-2015 
 Toto Cup: 2014-2015

References

External links
 Gael profile on Maccabi Tel Aviv official website.
 
 

1994 births
Israeli Jews
Living people
Israeli footballers
Maccabi Tel Aviv F.C. players
Maccabi Netanya F.C. players
Beitar Tel Aviv Bat Yam F.C. players
Israeli Premier League players
Footballers from Ramat HaSharon
Israeli people of Belgian-Jewish descent
Israeli people of Romanian-Jewish descent
Association football forwards